Calochilus uliginosus, commonly known as the swamp beard orchid, is a species of orchid endemic to Western Australia. It has a single dark green leaf with a reddish purple base and up to seven greenish to brownish flowers with red lines and a labellum with a reddish purple beard.

Description
The column has two purple "eyes" joined by a red ridge. Flowering occurs from October to December.

Taxonomy and naming
Calochilus uliginosus was first formally described in 2006 by David Jones and the description was published in Australian Orchid Research from a specimen collected near Albany. The specific epithet (uliginosus) is derived from a Latin word meaning "marsh" or "swamp", referring to the habitat preference of this species.

Distribution and habitat
The swamp beard orchid grows in dense undergrowth in seasonal swamps between Gingin and Albany in the Jarrah Forest, Swan Coastal Plain and Warren biogeographic regions.

References

uliginosus
Orchids of Western Australia
Endemic orchids of Australia
Plants described in 2006
Endemic flora of Western Australia